Tricholoma palustre is a mushroom of the agaric genus Tricholoma. It was formally described by American mycologist Alexander H. Smith in 1942.

See also
List of North American Tricholoma

References

palustre
Fungi described in 1942
Fungi of North America
Taxa named by Alexander H. Smith